Trilantic Capital Partners (Trilantic) is a global private equity firm focused on control and significant minority investments across a range of industries in North America and Europe managed by Trilantic North America and Trilantic Europe.   The firm specializes in management buyouts, recapitalizations, growth equity, middle market investments and corporate divestitures investments.  Trilantic invests through equity and equity-linked securities transactions.

Trilantic North America primarily targets investments in the business services, consumer, energy and financial services sectors; Trilantic Europe primarily targets investments in business services, consumer and leisure, healthcare, industrial and TMT sectors. The firm has managed six institutional private equity funds with aggregate capital commitments of $9.7 billion, as of July 2019.

History
Trilantic was spun out from Lehman Brothers Merchant Banking (LBMB), in 2009, by five founding partners, each of whom had workers at LBMB, which had been founded  as the private equity arm of Lehman Brothers, in 1986, during the 1980s leveraged buyout boom. In April 2009, Trilantic acquired LBMB out of the bankruptcy estate of Lehman Brothers with the support of Reinet Investments S.C.A, a Luxembourg securitization vehicle controlled by the Rupert family and listed on the Luxembourg Stock Exchange. On May 11, 2022, it was announced that Trilantic Europe is buying the polling company Kantar Public (previously part of the Kantar Group) in the third quarter of 2022.

See also
Lehman Brothers Venture Partners

References

External links
Trilantic Capital Partners (company website)

Lehman Brothers
Private equity firms of the United States
Investment banking private equity groups
Financial services companies established in 2009
1986 establishments in New York (state)
Companies based in London